Oxynoemacheilus erdali is a species of Cypriniformes fish in the genus Oxynoemacheilus.

Footnotes 
 

erdali
Endemic fauna of Turkey
Fish described in 2007
Taxa named by Füsun Erk'akan
Taxa named by Teodor T. Nalbant
Taxa named by Cevher Özeren